Atomic hydrogen welding (AHW) is an arc welding process that uses an arc between two tungsten electrodes in a shielding atmosphere of hydrogen. The process was invented by Irving Langmuir in the course of his studies of atomic hydrogen. The electric arc efficiently breaks up the hydrogen molecules, which later recombine with tremendous release of heat, reaching temperatures from 3400 to 4000 °C. Without the arc, an oxyhydrogen torch can only reach 2800 °C.  This is the third-hottest flame after dicyanoacetylene at 4987 °C and cyanogen at 4525 °C.  An acetylene torch merely reaches 3300 °C. This device may be called an atomic hydrogen torch, nascent hydrogen torch or Langmuir torch. The process was also known as arc-atom welding.

The heat produced by this torch is sufficient to weld tungsten (3422 °C), the most refractory metal. The presence of hydrogen also acts as a shielding gas, preventing oxidation and contamination by carbon, nitrogen or oxygen, which can severely damage the properties of many metals. It eliminates the need of flux for this purpose.

The arc is maintained independently of the workpiece or parts being welded. The hydrogen gas is normally diatomic (H2), but where the temperatures are over  near the arc, the hydrogen breaks down into its atomic form, absorbing a large amount of heat from the arc. When the hydrogen strikes a relatively cold surface (i.e. the weld zone), it recombines into its diatomic form, releasing the energy associated with the formation of that bond. The energy in AHW can be varied easily by changing the distance between the arc stream and the workpiece surface.

In atomic hydrogen welding, filler metal may or may not be used. In this process, the arc is maintained entirely independent of the work or parts being welded. The work is a part of the electrical circuit only to the extent that a portion of the arc comes in contact with the work, at which time a voltage exists between the work and each electrode.

This process is being replaced by gas metal-arc welding, mainly because of the availability of inexpensive inert gases.

Video documentation 
 The Inside of Atomic Hydrogen Arc Welding, Part 1 - 1943
 The Inside of Atomic Hydrogen Arc Welding, Part 2 - 1943

See also
 Oxy-fuel welding and cutting#Hydrogen

References

 Norton science encyclopedia 1st and 6th edition    copyright 1921–1950 and 1976
 Van Nostrand's Encyclopedia of Science  (Pg. 1311)
 Welding Handbook Vol. 2 Library of Congress number 90-085465   copyright 1991 by American Welding Society
 Kalpkjian, Serope and Steven R. Schmid. Manufacturing Engineering and Technology textbook  Fifth edition. Upper Saddle River: Pearson Education, Inc., 2006
 
 
 

Arc welding
Hydrogen technologies